Johnsons Station ( Johnson Station) was an unincorporated community in Tarrant County, located in the U.S. state of Texas. The area is now within the city of Arlington.

References

External links

Unincorporated communities in Tarrant County, Texas
Unincorporated communities in Texas